The following lists events that happened during 2014 in the Solomon Islands.

Incumbents
Monarch: Elizabeth II
Governor-General: Frank Kabui
Prime Minister: Gordon Darcy Lilo (until December 9), Manasseh Sogavare (starting December 9)

Events

April
 April 4 - Heavy rainfall from a tropical low causes flooding at Honiara leading to at least 16 deaths and thousands of people being evacuated.
 A 7.7 magnitude earthquake occurs on April 13 204 miles southeast of Honiara, although no fatalities or property damage was recorded.

August
 August 13 - The Solomon Islands recognise Kosovo.

November
 November 19 - Independents win a majority of seats in the National Parliament of the Solomon Islands.

References

 
Solomon Islands
Solomon Islands
2010s in the Solomon Islands
Years of the 21st century in the Solomon Islands